Revolutionart  is an international magazine about  graphic design, visual arts, and lifestyle.  Some of their contributors were Floria Sigismondi, Mark Miremont, Andrzej Dragan, Matt Mignanelli, Skew Siskin, Jeremyville, Mandy Lynn  Oliviero Toscani, Simone Legno, Tino Soriano, Lemmy Kilmister, Paul Matthaeus and Justin Lassen.

Contents 
The magazine presents themes related to the world crisis but it also publishes writings on art, culture, politics, and ideas. Each edition is commanded by a matter of global concern in which artists from all around the world express their appreciation graphically. Revolutionart contains work of known  photographers, international designers, illustrators, models, art directors, rockstars and music bands.

All editions of Revolutionart are free.

Contributions 
Revolutionart International Magazine has been part of Colophon 2009 in Luxembourg publicationes like We Make Magazines and sponsor of international events like Dotmov 2009 (Japan), What's More Alive Than You (Italy), Art By Chance 2010, Artelaguna Prize, Annual Design Awards 2010 or Technarte 2013

Issues and guests

Revolutionart 28 - February 2011

Issue : Myths and Legends

Guests: Paul Matthaeus (United States), Jean Jacques André (Canada), Brian Olsen (United States)

Revolutionart 27 - November 2010 

Issue : Underwater Life

Guests: Matt Dobson (United Kingdom), Aegis (Spain)

Revolutionart 26 - September 2010 

Issue : Internet

Guests: Steve McGhee (Canada), Guido Torres-Brousset (Perú), Adam Sund (Denmark)

Revolutionart 25 - July 2010 

Issue : Evolution

Guests: Thomas Tibitanzl (Germany)

Revolutionart 24 - May 2010 

Issue : Climate Change

Guests: Ken Penn (United States), Martin Sati (Spain)

Revolutionart 23 - March 2010 

Issue : Space

Guests: Ledfoot / Tim Scott McConnell (Norway), Philip Straub (United States)

Revolutionart 22 - January 2010 

Issue : End of Humanity

Guests: Lemmy Kilmister from Mötorhead (England), Stephan Weidner (Germany)

Revolutionart 21 - November 2009 (unreleased)

Issue : Recycle

Guests: Nicco Di Mattia (Argentina)

Revolutionart 20 - September 2009

Issue : Ethnic

Guests: Simone Legno / Tokidoki (Italy)

Revolutionart 19 - July 2009

Issue : Biohazard Alert

Guests: Mark Page (U.K.), Juan Siwak (Argentina) 

Revolutionart 18 - May 2009 

Issue : Let's Rock

Guests: Dale May (U.S.), Sanjay Chand

Revolutionart 17 - March 2009

Issue : Love

Guests: Bogdan Zwir (Russia), Mark Miremont (USA), Bettie Page Memorial, Simon Hoegsberg (Denmark)

Revolutionart 16 - January 2009

Issue : Global Crisis

Guests: Dust For Likfe (USA), Skew Siskin (Germany)

Revolutionart 15 - November 2008

Issue : Dreams

Guests: Nina C Alice (Germany), Andrzej Dragan (Poland)

Revolutionart 14 - September 2008

Issue : I Believe

Guests: Richard Best (USA)

Revolutionart 13 - July 2008

Issue : Politics

Guests: Michael Dawidowicz (Au), Matt Mignanelli(USA), Bambi (Deu), Justin Lassen (USA), Joey Lawrence (Ca), Fernanda Cohen, Brian Viveros

Revolutionart 12 - May 2008

Issue : Nature

Guests: Ee Venn Soh (Malaysia), Igor Siwanowicz (Germany), Johan Wahlback (Sweden)

Revolutionart 11 - March 2008

Issue : RetroPop

Guests: JeremyVille (Australia), Joey Lawrence (Canada)

Revolutionart 10 - January 2008

Issue : Message to the world

Guests: Adhemas Batista (Brazil), Patrick Boyer (Canada)

Revolutionart 9 - November 2007

Issue : Industrial

Guests: Nik Ainley (UK)

Revolutionart 8 - September 2007

Issue : Planet Earth

Guests: Matt Mignanelli (USA), Marcelo Lozada (Argentina), David Quin (France), Michael Helms (USA)

Revolutionart 7 - July 2007

Issue : Superstar

Guests: Jeff Finley (Usa)

Revolutionart 6 - May 2007

Issue : Love

Guests: Tino Soriano (Spain), Orodé (Italy)

Revolutionart 5 - March 2007

Issue : Music, Peace & Love

Guests: Kristal Blanco (Italy), Justin Lassen (USA)

Revolutionart 4 - January 2007

Issue : Dirt

Guests: Floria Sigismondi (USA)

Revolutionart 3 - October 2006

Issue : Hot

Guests: Sue Cane (Germany/Spain), Rodrigo Damian (Argentina)

Revolutionart 2 - July 2006

Issue : Fictional Product

Guests: Michael Dawidowicz (Australia), Jay Lim (Malaysia)

Revolutionart 1 - March 2006

Issue : Free Theme

Guests: Fernanda Cohen (USA)

References

Online magazines
English-language magazines
Fashion magazines
Design magazines
Bi-monthly magazines
Magazines established in 2006